The Royal House of Dinefwr was a cadet branch of the Royal House of Gwynedd, founded by King Cadell ap Rhodri (reign 872–909), son of Rhodri the Great. Their ancestor, Cunedda Wledig, born in late Roman Britain, was a Sub-Roman warlord ​who founded the Kingdom of Gwynedd during the 5th century, following the Anglo-Saxon settlement of Britain. As Celtic Britons, the House of Dinefwr was ruling before the Norman conquest, having to fight with their neighbors such as the Celtics, Anglo-Saxons and Vikings, before struggling with the Normans afterwards. Many members of this family were influential in Welsh history, such a Hywel Dda, who codified Welsh law under his rule, and achieved the important title of King of the Britons, or Lord Rhys, Prince of Wales, who rebelled against Richard the Lionheart, and became one of the most powerful Welsh leaders of the Middle ages.

History

With the death of Rhodri Mawr, the Kingdom of Gwynedd passed to his eldest son Anarawd ap Rhodri. Rhodri's second son Cadell ap Rhodri, however, looked outside Gwynedd's traditional borders and took possession of the Early Medieval Kingdom of Dyfed by the late 9th century, establishing his capital at the citadel of Dinefwr Castle. Cadell ap Rhodri's descendants are designated Dinefwr after the citadel from which they would rule Dyfed. 

The Dinefwr dynasty under King Hywel Dda would unite Dyfed and Seisyllwg into the Kingdom of Deheubarth in the early 10th century. During his reign, Hywel Dda would have to submit to the King of the Anglo-Saxons, Edward the Elder, and thereafter support his successor King Æthelstan, the first King of England, and his invasion of Scotland. His legacy would be the codification of Welsh law known as the Laws of Hywel Dda, as he had gathered expert lawyers and priests from all over the country under his leadership for its formation. 

The Dinefwrs would rule in Deheubarth until their conquest by the Plantagenet kings in the 13th century. This branch would compete with the House of Aberffraw for supremacy and influence in Wales throughout the 10th, 11th and 12th centuries, with the Kingdom of Powys variously ruled between them. Eventually, a cadet branch of the House of Dinefwr would establish itself in Powys by the mid-11th century, designating themselves as the House of Mathrafal after the castle there named Mathrafal Castle. This dynasty will be the last with a native Welsh Prince of Wales before its annexation into the Kingdom of England.

During the 12th century, Lord Rhys's father, Prince Gruffydd ap Rhys, fought the Normans following the civil war in England and Normandy. This war arose from the rival claims of Stephen of Blois and Empress Matilda to the throne England as descendants of William the Conqueror. From that era, Lord Rhys would end up becoming one of the most successful and powerful Welsh leaders of the Middle Ages, fighting against King Henry Plantagenet as well as against his son, Richard the Lionheart, attacking his Norman lordship and capturing many of his castles. Through Lord Rhys's daughter Gwenllian, wife of Seneschal Ednyfed Fychan, he would also become an ancestor of the House of Tudor, House of Stuart, as well as the current reigning House of Windsor.

Other important members of the Dinefwr family were Sir Rhys ap Gruffydd and Sir Rhys ap Thomas. Sir Rhys ap Gruffydd, a descendant of Ednyfed Fychan, rose to prominence after supporting Hugh Despenser, Earl of Winchester, and Hugh Despenser the Younger, who became the Royal Chamberlain. From supporting the Angevin cause, he would end up becoming the wealthiest and most influential figure among the native Welsh gentry of the 14th century. Thereafter, he was involved in the abdication of Edward II, and joined the new King, Edward of Windsor, fighting for him and Edward the Black Prince at the Battle of Crecy. 

One of Rhys ap Gruffydd's descendant, Sir Rhys ap Thomas, would later be instrumental during the War of the Roses, being one of the leader and commander at the Battle of Bosworth Field, alongside the future King as well as Jasper Tudor, Duke of Bedford, and John de Vere, 13th Earl of Oxford. From that victory, he received lands and positions, such as  Privy Councillor, Chamberlain, Justiciar of South Wales and Governor of all Wales. He supported the next King Henry VIII, and joined him and Maximilian I, Holy Roman Emperor, of the House of Habsburg, at the Battle of the Spurs in France. He was also one of the Garter Knights to accompany the King in 1520 at his meeting with Francis I of France at the Field of the Cloth of Gold. He spent his later years at Carew Castle in Wales after receiving the titles of Knight Banneret and Knight of the Garter.

Ancestral seat

The ancestral seat of the dynasty was Dinefwr Castle, initially built by the Prince of Wales, Lord Rhys, and eventually seized during the 16th century by the Tudor King Henry VIII, as the then owner, Rhys ap Gruffydd, was accused of plotting with King James V of Scotland to replace him and become Prince of Wales. Rhys was powerful and had married well. His wife, Catherine Howard, was a cousin of Queen Anne Boleyn, and the daughter of Thomas Howard, 2nd Duke of Norfolk. Their ancestral seat would eventually be restored by Queen Mary Tudor. A house was also rebuilt in Dinefwr Park, now called Newton House, and the descendants of Lord Rhys anglicized their name from Rhys to Rice. 

William Talbot, 1st Earl Talbot, became the first Baron Dynevor, an anglicization of Dinefwr. He was made Privy Councillor, Lord High Steward, and Lord Steward of the Household under King George III of the House of Hanover. He also married the daughter and heiress of Adam de Cardonnel, Secretary of John Churchill, Duke of Marlborough of Blenheim Palace. This branch continued the line of Sir Rhys ap Thomas. 

Another notable member was Walter Rice, 7th Baron Dynevor, who served Lord George Hamilton, and married to a daughter of the Viceroy of South Wales, Victor Child Villiers, 7th Earl of Jersey, of Osterley Park, member of the Ducal House of Villiers. His son David Reginald Rhys (1907-1991) married Anne Wellesley, 7th Duchess of Ciudad Rodrigo, a member of the Spanish nobility, and descendant of the Duke of Wellington who defeated Napoleon at Waterloo.

As Spanish law allowed the inheritance of estates and titles in the female line, Anne became Duchess after the death of her brother Henry, making her husband David Rhys, Duke of Ciudad Rodrigo and Grandee of Spain, and heir of their estates in Andalusia. The Wellesley family negotiated with the couple to get the title and estates back, and the matter was settled between the families. Their daughter Imogen Alice Rhys (1903-2001), married David Brand, 5th Viscount Hampden, Chairman of the English, Scottish & Australian Bank, and grandson of William Montagu Douglas Scott, 6th Duke of Buccleuch of Boughton House. 

The most recent Baron Dynevors are Richard Rhys, 9th Baron Dynevor (b. 1935) and Hugo Rhys, 10th Baron Dynevor (b. 1966). The heir presumptive is the present holder's second cousin, Robert David Arthur Rhys (b. 1963) and afterwards, Robert's son Edward (b. 2002).

The dynasty also attacked and captured many castles throughout the centuries such as Cardigan Castle, Kidwelly Castle, Rhuddlan Castle, Carmarthen Castle, Laugharne Castle, Llandovery Castle, Swansea Castle,  Aberystwyth Castle, Oystermouth Castle, Llansteffan Castle, Tenby Castle, Aberavon Castle, St Clears Castle, Aberdyfi Castle, Cilgerran Castle, Builth Castle, Nevern Castle, Painscastle, Colwyn Castle, New Radnor Castle.

Members

Before the Norman Conquest 
Hywel Dda, Prince of Seisyllwg and Deheubarth, King of Dyfed, Powys and Gwynedd, he codified Welsh law under his rule, known as the Laws of Hywel Dda, and did a pilgrimage to Rome later in his life
Owain ap Hywel Dda, King of South Wales, he attacked the Kingdom of Morgannwg with his sons, and paid tribute to the English king Edgar the Peaceful, a member of the Royal House of Wessex
Maredudd ab Owain, King of the Britons, he was featured in the Chronicle of the Princes, and struggled on many occasions with Vikings and their invasions in Wales, he raided the Kingdom of Mercia
Maredudd ab Owain ab Edwin, Welsh prince, he fought against the Normans and supported the English magnate Eadric the Wild in his conquest, was awarded lands in England as a result
Rhys ab Owain, King of Deheubarth, he fought against the King of Gwynedd and Powys, he was killed at war by Prince Caradog ap Gruffydd, he was implicated in the killing of King Bleddyn ap Cynfyn
Cadell ap Rhodri, King of Seisyllwg, ruled a minor kingdom in south of Wales, was nephew of Gwgon, King of Ceredigion, with his son they conquered the Kingdom of Dyfed
Einion ab Owain, Welsh prince, he fought with King Iago ab Idwal against the Irish and Vikings, and later against Ælfhere, Ealdorman of Mercia, he was in conflict with Edgar, King of England
Llywelyn ap Seisyll,  King of the Britons, killed prince Aeddan ap Blegywryd, and was featured in Brut y Tywysogion and Annals of Ulster, his sons died fighting at the Battle of Mechain
Rhain the Irishman, King of Dyfed, featured in the Annales Cambriae, possible pretender to the throne, killed by King Llywelyn ap Seisyll, his body was not discovered
Rhodri ap Hywel, King of Deheubarth, son of the King of the Britons, co-ruled with Edwin and Owain, lost land to the Aberffraw dynasty, and was defeated at a Battle in Llanrwst

After the Norman Conquest 

Rhys ap Tewdwr, King in Southern Wales, made an agreement with William the Conqueror for his Kingdom, was later forced to flee to Ireland, came back with a fleet and attacked the Royal House of Mathrafal
Gruffydd ap Rhys, prince of Deheubarth, fought against the Normans following the wars of Stephen of Blois and Empress Matilda, he refused to pay homage to King Stephen of England in London
Nest ferch Rhys, Welsh Princess, she was brought at the court of King William Rufus, son of William the Conqueror, she married to Gerald of Windsor, founder of the House of Fitzgerald, and former Constable of Pembroke Castle
Rhys ap Gruffydd, Prince of Wales, fought against Richard the Lionheart, captured many of his castles, and built Carreg Cennen castle, was summoned by King Henry Plantagenet to pay him homage with Malcolm IV of Scotland
Gwenllian, daughter of Rhys ap Gruffydd, married to Seneschal Ednyfed Fychan, who fought against the army of Ranulph de Blondeville, 4th Earl of Chester, she was ancestor of Sir Owen Tudor and the Tudor dynasty
Angharad, daughter of Rhys ap Gruffydd, married to William FitzMartin, Lord of Cemais, his castle was taken by his father-in-law and given to his son, her father was the most powerful man in Wales
Annest ferch Rhys, daughter of Rhys ap Gruffydd, married to Rhodri ab Owain, a Prince of Gwynedd, of the Royal House of Aberffraw, he made an alliance with Raghnall mac Gofraidh, King of Mann and the Isles
Gruffydd ap Rhys II, Welsh prince, captured Cilgerran Castle, made an agreement with King John of England, was son-in-law of Lord William de Braose, a Royal favourite who fought in the war against Philip Augustus, 1st King of France
Maelgwn ap Rhys, Welsh prince, he captured Cardigan Castle, then sold it to King John of England, he then seized Cilgerran Castle but later lost it to William Marshal, 1st Earl of Pembroke
Anarawd ap Gruffydd, Prince of Deheubarth, joined the war of Prince Owain Gwynedd and his brother Cadwaladr ap Gruffydd, and attacked Cardigan Castle with a Viking fleet against the Normans
Cadell ap Gruffydd, Prince of Deheubarth, captured Llansteffan Castle and Carmarthen Castle, was attacked and injured by the Normans during a hunt, he left Wales for a pilgrimage to Rome
Maredudd ap Gruffydd, prince in South-West Wales, fought with his half-brother, Cadell, against the Normans, expelling them from the Kingdom of Ceredigion, he became King after his brother left Wales for Rome
Rhys ap Maredudd, Welsh prince, was awarded lands by Edward Longshanks, and lived at Dryslwyn Castle, he later rebelled and was executed for treason at York, his son was imprisoned at Bristol Castle
Rhys Gryg, Welsh prince, fought against Baron Falkes de Bréauté, his wife was the sister of Gilbert de Clare, 5th Earl of Gloucester, a signatory of Magna Carta, his widow remarried to Richard Plantagenet, King of the Romans
Maredudd ap Rhys Gryg, was in the wardship of Gilbert Marshal, 4th Earl of Pembroke, his aunt was Countess Isabel Marshal, the great grandmother of Robert the Bruce, King of Scots
Rhys Mechyll, Welsh prince, married to Matilda de Braose (Deheubarth), his sole heiress married into the House of Talbot and assumed the arms of the House of Dinefwr, she was related to the Royal House of Stuart
Sir Rhys ap Thomas, most powerful man in Wales, he fought at the Battle of Bosworth with the first monarch of the House of Tudor, Henry VII, and later with Henry VIII at the Battle of the Spurs with the Habsburgs
Sir Gruffydd ap Rhys, married to a relative of Margaret Beaufort, the grandmother of Henry VIII, they both served Queen Catherine of Aragon and Arthur, Prince of Wales
Rhys ap Gruffydd (rebel), married to Lady Catherine, daughter of Thomas Howard, 2nd Duke of Norfolk, the grandfather of Queen Anne Boleyn, he was in conflict with Lord Walter Devereux, and petitioned Cardinal Thomas Wolsey 
Agnes Rice, 2nd wife of William Stourton, 7th Baron Stourton, the in-law of Andrew Windsor, 1st Baron Windsor of Hewell Grange, his estate was later envied by Baron Ferdinand de Rothschild of Waddesdon Manor
William Talbot, Earl Talbot, 1st Baron Dynevor, was Lord High Steward to King George III, his father-in-law was Secretary to John Churchill, 1st Duke of Marlborough of Blenheim Palace
George Rice, 3rd Baron Dynevor, son of George Rice, Lord Commissioner of the Board of trade to Thomas Pelham-Holles, 1st Duke of Newcastle, the Prime Minister of Great Britain
George Rice-Trevor, 4th Baron Dynevor, married to a daughter of General Lord FitzRoy, son of Augustus, 3rd Duke of Grafton, Prime Minister of Great Britain and descendant of King Charles II of the House of Stuart
Selina Rice-Trevor (1836–1918), married to William Pakenham, 4th Earl of Longford, a General during the Indian Rebellion and Crimean War of Napoleon III of the House of Bonaparte
Walter Rice, 7th Baron Dynevor, President of the South Wales Conservatives, married to a daughter of Victor Child Villiers, 7th Earl of Jersey, of the House of Villiers, the family of the Dukes of Buckingham
Anne Rhys (1910-1998), Duchess of Ciudad Rodrigo, daughter of Arthur Wellesley, 5th Duke of Wellington, and granddaughter of Arthur Wellesley of Apsley House, Prince of Waterloo and Duke of Victoria

Castles

Sources

Castles of Wales by John Davis, 6 apr 2022 - 252 pages
The Royal Families in Europe V by Lars Ulwencreutz - 742 pages
Gruffydd ap Nicholas and the rise of the House of Dinefwr, National Library of Wales, journal, page 256
The Longhunters: A Report on the History and Family of William Blevins Sr. of Virginia by Leslie W. Blevins Jr. apr 2012 · Xlibris Corporation, - 210 pages
Cardiganshire County History Volume 2: Medieval and Early Modern Cardiganshire (The Cardiganshire County History) by Geraint H. Jenkins, - 921 pages

 
Welsh royal houses